Two provincial by-elections were held in the Canadian province of Manitoba on March 24, 2009 to fill vacancies in the Legislative Assembly of Manitoba. Both were won by the governing Manitoba New Democratic Party.

Elmwood
The electoral district of Elmwood became vacant in fall 2008 when incumbent New Democratic Party MLA Jim Maloway resigned from the legislature to run as the federal New Democratic Party candidate in Elmwood—Transcona in the 2008 federal election.

Bill Blaikie, the former MP whose retirement from federal politics opened up the NDP candidacy in Elmwood—Transcona, subsequently announced his intention to stand in the provincial by-election. Two other candidates, Ed Innes and Darryl Livingstone, had submitted nomination papers, but both dropped out before the nomination meeting, and Blaikie was acclaimed as the party's candidate on December 14, 2008.
The Manitoba Progressive Conservative Party chose Adrian Schulz, a 25-year-old businessman who left high school at 14 to start his first computer business, the Manitoba Liberal Party chose Regan Wolfrom, a community activist, and the Green Party of Manitoba candidate was James Beddome, who was selected as the party's new leader in 2008.

Blaikie won the by-election, marking the first time in his 30-year political career that he will be serving in a governing party caucus rather than an opposition role.

The Pas
The electoral district of The Pas became vacant with the death of incumbent New Democratic MLA Oscar Lathlin on November 1, 2008. The by-election was won by Frank Whitehead, a former chief of the Opaskwayak Cree Nation, who ran for the New Democrats.

The Liberal candidate was Maurice Berens, a high school teacher from Norway House, and the Progressive Conservatives selected Edna Nabess, a clothing store owner in The Pas.

References

Elections in Manitoba
2009 elections in Canada
Provincial by-elections in Manitoba
2009 in Manitoba